Alphonse Louis Nicolas Borrelly (December 8, 1842 – February 28, 1926) was a French astronomer.

He joined the Marseille Observatory in 1864. In the course of his career, he discovered a number of asteroids and comets, including the periodic comet 19P/Borrelly.

The French Academy of Sciences awarded him the Prix Valz for 1903 and the Prix Lalande for 1909. The asteroid 1539 Borrelly was named in his honor.

In 1913, he received the Prix Jules Janssen, the highest award of the Société astronomique de France, the French astronomical society.

Comets discovered or co-discovered
The following is an incomplete list of comets discovered or co-discovered by Borrelly:
 C/1873 Q1 (Borrelly)
 C/1877 C1 (Borrelly)
 C/1877 G2 (Swift-Borrelly-Block)
 C/1889 X1 (Borrelly)
 19P/Borrelly
 C/1909 L1 (Borrelly-Daniel)

References

External links
  Obituary

1842 births
1926 deaths
19th-century French astronomers
20th-century French astronomers
Discoverers of asteroids
Discoverers of comets
Recipients of the Lalande Prize